Jan-Henrik Heinrich (born 19 July 1963) is a German sport shooter who competed in the 1996 Summer Olympics and in the 2000 Summer Olympics. In 1996, he tied for 26th place in the men's skeet event. In 2000, he tied for 14th place in the men's skeet event.

References

1963 births
Living people
German male sport shooters
Skeet shooters
Olympic shooters of Germany
Shooters at the 1996 Summer Olympics
Shooters at the 2000 Summer Olympics
20th-century German people
21st-century German people